Water betony may refer to:

Scrophularia umbrosa, a species of plant
Shargacucullia scrophulariae, a species of moth